John Walsh (born December 12, 1972) is a former American football quarterback. He was the starting quarterback for Brigham Young University during the 1993 and 1994 seasons.

He left college as a junior to enter the NFL Draft based on overly optimistic draft expectations.  Although he was drafted in the 7th round by the Cincinnati Bengals, he was cut shortly thereafter and never played in the National Football League.

1993: 244/397 for 3,727 yards with 28 TD vs 15 INT.
1994: 284/463 for 3,712 yards with 29 TD vs 14 INT.

See also
 List of college football yearly passing leaders

References

1972 births
Living people
American football quarterbacks
BYU Cougars football players
Cincinnati Bengals players